is a Japanese baseball player. Born in Tochigi, he won a bronze medal at the 1992 Summer Olympics.

References
 

1967 births
Living people
Baseball players at the 1992 Summer Olympics
Olympic baseball players of Japan
Olympic medalists in baseball

Medalists at the 1992 Summer Olympics
Olympic bronze medalists for Japan